Alta Lake was a recreational community and railway station on the west side of Alta Lake.  It is now a neighbourhood of Whistler, British Columbia, Canada.  The post office was renamed Whistler in 1976 when the area was incorporated as part of the Resort Municipality of Whistler.

Canada was shocked when the Canadian Broadcasting Corporation led its morning radio broadcast about Pierre Elliott Trudeau, the bachelor Prime Minister of Canada since 1968, honeymooning at Alta Lake at the condominium owned by his new in-laws, former federal Cabinet minister Jimmy Sinclair and his wife Kathleen, the day after a surprise wedding in North Vancouver, British Columbia on March 4, 1971 to Margaret Sinclair.

See also
Rainbow Lodge

References

Whistler, British Columbia
Populated places in the Squamish-Lillooet Regional District
Unincorporated settlements in British Columbia